In Japan, an  is an establishment where patrons are entertained by geisha. A now-archaic term that arose in the Edo period,  in the modern day refers exclusively to the establishments within Kyoto in which geisha work and entertain their clients, though the term is sometimes used to describe all establishments used by geisha to entertain guests, irrespective of location.

Terminology

When used as part of a name, the honorific prefix  is not used in Japanese, and the plain  is used as a suffix, as in "Ichiriki Chaya". In English, this is not always observed, and terminology such as "Ichiriki Ochaya" is sometimes used.  are often referred to instead simply by their name, as in "(the) Ichiriki".

Access

 are typically very exclusive establishments; with very rare exceptions, a person may only enter if they are already an established patron, or are accompanied by a patron, with reservations.

Relationships to  can often be traced back generations, and are generally associated with a family or company. Switching  is not generally possible, and even patronizing  other than the one with which one is associated is considered a very serious breach of manners.

In exceptional circumstances, these restrictions are relaxed. For example, for a brief period of only a few nights in 2006, one  in each of the five Kyoto geisha districts offered general access to a small number of tourists who were unaccompanied by patrons, as part of a tourism promotion program, at the request of the Kyoto City Tourist Association.

Identification
In Kyoto,  are licensed by the city, and all display a metal badge at the entrance reading  (Kyoto public license #...).

Design
As traditional establishments,  occupy buildings exemplifying traditional Japanese architecture, most often  style construction, particularly in Kyoto.

Services

Examples
The most notable and famous  is the Ichiriki Chaya in the Gion district of Kyoto, considered one of the most exclusive  in Japan. The Ichiriki features as a major setting in Arthur Golden's fictional portrayal of a Gion geisha's life, Memoirs of a Geisha.

See also

References

External links
祇園一力亭 (Gion Ichiriki-tei – article shows pictures of interior, a private dance show, and the house's matchbox) (in Japanese)

Geisha
Japanese words and phrases